Aïn Madhi is a district in Laghouat Province, Algeria. It was named after its capital, Aïn Madhi.

Municipalities
The district is further divided into 5 municipalities, the highest number in the province:
Aïn Madhi
 Tadjmout
Tadjrouna
El Houaita
Kheneg

References

Districts of Laghouat Province